Geostachys is a genus of plants in the Zingiberaceae. It is native to southeast Asia.

 species

References

Alpinioideae
Zingiberaceae genera
Taxa named by John Gilbert Baker
Taxa named by Henry Nicholas Ridley